The 1889 American Cup was the fifth edition of the soccer tournament organized by the American Football Association. The Fall River Rovers won their second consecutive title by defeating the Newark Caledonians in the final.

Participants
Newcomers to the tournament were the Paterson Rangers and Trenton Rovers. Absent was the Ansonia team while New York was defunct and the Kearny Rangers had amalgamated with ONT. 
New Jersey- Trenton, Trenton Rovers, Paterson, Paterson Rangers, Clark O.N.T., Alma, Tiffany Rovers, and, Newark Caledonian. 
New York- Thistles and Amateur League.
New England- Fall River Olympics, Providence Athletics, Pawtucket Free Wanderers, Fall River Rovers, Fall River East Ends.

First round
The Fall River Olympics drew a first round bye. The first game between the Almas and Paterson was not completed due to the ball bursting early in the second half. Paterson refused to continue so Alma claimed the contest. However, after a meeting of the delegates it was decided that the game should be replayed because the game had started without a referee in the first place. Clark ONT was awarded their replay match as a result of Trenton Rovers failure to appear. 

Providence: GK Bailey, DF G.Clegg, McDonald, MF Davina, Cook, Start, FW Thorney, Cook, Axon, Brennan, Healabourn.
Pawtucket: GK Watmouth, DF H.Stuart, A.Love, MF J.Dalton, F.Finn, D.Smith, FW Hardy, Mullarkey, Murray, Sandilands, Fd.Lennox.

Rovers: GK D.Shea, FB R.Harwood, F.Bradley, HB B.Fagan, H.Waring, J.Buckley, RW R.Bell, F.Cornell, LW , C.Duff, Wild, C Duff
East Ends: GK Ratcliffe , FB Woodcock, Harrington, HB Coupe, A.Bell, Foley, RW Farrell, Tobin, LW Buckley, Whitaker, C Beattie

replays

Alma- G F.Farrow, DF G.Wright, Ely Morton, MF Frank Britchford, J.Hood, Robert Paterson, RW Walter Taylor, J.Curtin, LW H.Shaw, P.Brennan, C J.Gray(c)
Paterson- G Isaac Sutton, FB John W.Smallwood, George Henshall, HB Thomas Evans, William Jones, James Henshall(c), RW William McDonald, Samuel Alberson, LW Thomas Turner, Samuel Saunders, C J.W.Warburton

Caledonian- GK J.Thompson, DF J.Byrne, D.Gloak, MF W.Barr, R.McDonald, W.Hood, FW R.McWilliams, T.Hendry, R.Barr, W.Thornton, J.Heron. Tiffany- GK W.Healy, DF T.Crann, M.Flannery, MF D.McCune, E.Hinkley, J.Singleton, FW J.Jeffs, M.Downs, A.Hinkley, T.Flynn, J.Norton.

Second round
Pawtucket and Thistles drew a second round bye.

Rovers: GK Shea, DF Harwood, Fagan, MF Bradley, Waring, Lonsdale, FW Bell, Bruckshaw, Buckley, Bell, Cornell. Olympics: GK Brackell, DF Williamson, Lee, MF Tomlinson, Pilling, Brown, FW Hoctor, Corbet, Taylor, Ingham, Randall.

Alma: GK F.Farrow, DF E.Morton, G.Wright, MF J.Britchford, J.Hood, R.Patterson, FW J.Gray, P.Brennan, H.Shaw, Walter Taylor, J.Smith. Caledonian: GK J.Thompson, DF G.Gloak, J.Brown, MF W.Barr, R.McDonald, W.Stalker, FW R.McWilliams, T.Hendry, J.McCormack, J.Williamson, R.Barr.

Third round
ONT drew a bye.

Thistle- G Cameron, FB Russell, Patrick, HB Bailey, Harley, Kirk, RW Scott, Jameson, LW Walker, Barber, C Wind
Caledonian- G Thompson, FB Brown, Gloak, HB Barr, McDonald, Head, RW McWilliams, Hendry, LW R.Barr, Williamson, C McCormack

Pawtucket: GK James Hardy(c), FB Harry Stuart, Alexander Love, HB James Dalton, Frank Finn, David Smith LW William Mullarkey, M.Murray, RW Robert Sandilands, Edward Lennox, C John Stuart.
Rovers: GK Dennis Shay, FB Richard Harwood, Bernard Fagan(c), HB Frank Bradley, Henry Waring, Richard Lonsdale, RW Robert Bell, Thomas Bruckshaw, LW Joseph Buckley, Charles Duff, C Frank Cornell.

Semifinal
Caledonians drew a bye.

Rovers: GK D.Shay, FB R.Harwood, B.Fagan, HB F.Bradley, H.Waring, R.Lonsdale, RW R.Bell, T.Bruckshaw, LW J.Buckley, C.Duff, C F.Cornell
O.N.T.: GK P.Hughes, FB Line, E.Walker, HB Pallishaw, Jos.Swithumby, Alsop, RW Connelly, Fisher, LW John Swithumby, McAuley, C Campbell

Final

American Cup bracket

Champions

References

Sources
Outing
National Police Gazette
New York Herald
New York Times
Spirit of the Times
Trenton Times
Fall River Herald
Daily Advertiser
Evening News
Sunday Call

1889
1889 in association football
1889 in American sports